The 1994 Slamboree: A Legends Reunion was the second Slamboree professional wrestling pay-per-view (PPV) event produced by World Championship Wrestling (WCW). It took place on May 22, 1994, at the Philadelphia Civic Center in Philadelphia, Pennsylvania. In 2014, the event was made available for streaming on the WWE Network.

Prior to Slamboree, WCW approached Eastern Championship Wrestling about cross-promoting with ECW's When Worlds Collide event, which was scheduled to take place in Philadelphia on May 14, 1994. The two promotions agreed to a talent exchange in which WCW wrestlers Arn Anderson and Bobby Eaton would appear at When Worlds Collide, while ECW wrestler Terry Funk would appear at Slamboree.

Storylines
The event featured professional wrestling matches that involve different wrestlers from pre-existing scripted feuds and storylines. Professional wrestlers portray villains, heroes, or less distinguishable characters in the scripted events that build tension and culminate in a wrestling match or series of matches.

Event

Prior to the pay-per-view portion of the show WCW introduced a group of "legends" to the crowd: Ole Anderson, Penny Banner, Red Bastien, Tully Blanchard, The Crusher, Don Curtis, Terry Funk, Verne Gagne, Hard Boiled Haggerty, Larry Hennig, Killer Kowalski, Ernie Ladd, Wahoo McDaniel, Angelo Mosca, Harley Race, Ray Stevens, Lou Thesz, Johnny Weaver, Mr. Wrestling II, and Tommy Young. Later in the night The Assassin, Ole Anderson, Harley Race, Ernie Ladd, The Crusher, and Dick the Bruiser were inducted into the WCW Hall of Fame.

Cactus Jack replaced an injured Dave Sullivan in the WCW World Tag Team Championship match. Vader was originally scheduled to wrestle Rick Rude, but Rude had to be replaced by Sting as Rude had suffered a career-ending back injury in Japan, in a match against Sting.

This was also the final WCW pay per view were they had the traditional entrance ramp way connected to the ring

Results

References

External links 
 

Professional wrestling in Philadelphia
Events in Philadelphia
1994 in Pennsylvania
1994
May 1994 events in the United States
1994 World Championship Wrestling pay-per-view events